Fellowship School is a school located at Gowalia Tank, August Kranti Marg in South Mumbai, India. Established in 1927, the school provides education in Gujarati and English mediums. It mainly caters to children coming from the affluent Gujarati business community.

The Fellowship Society Trust, which runs or manages the School tied up with another trust and opened a new school on its campus. Bright Start Fellowship School offered ICSE Co-Education, but has converted to offer IGCSE (an education curriculum introduced by Cambridge University).

External links
 Fellowship School website
 Article about the school on Planetvidyaschools

Schools in Mumbai
Educational institutions established in 1927
1927 establishments in India